Zdeněk Otáhal (31 January 1936 – 1 July 2004) was a Czech weightlifter. He competed at the 1960 Summer Olympics and the 1964 Summer Olympics.

References

External links
 

1936 births
2004 deaths
Czech male weightlifters
Olympic weightlifters of Czechoslovakia
Weightlifters at the 1960 Summer Olympics
Weightlifters at the 1964 Summer Olympics
People from Benešov
Sportspeople from the Central Bohemian Region